Modena is an unincorporated community in southwestern Mercer County, Missouri, United States. It is located approximately eight miles southeast of Princeton on Missouri Supplemental Route A.

Modena was originally called Madisonville, and it was platted under the latter name in 1856. A post office called Modena was established in 1858, and remained in operation until 1971. The present name most likely is a transfer from Mòdena, Italy.

References

Italian-American culture in Missouri
Unincorporated communities in Mercer County, Missouri
Populated places established in 1856
Unincorporated communities in Missouri